Piedmont Records is an American independent record label, set up in the early 1960s by Dick Spottswood.

Piedmont Records issued - among others - the first recordings after their 'rediscovery' of Mississippi John Hurt and Robert Wilkins.

See also 
 List of record labels

External links
 Illustrated Piedmont Records discography

Defunct record labels of the United States
Blues record labels
American independent record labels